Maenggoldo, or Maenggol Island, is an island in South Korea's Dadohaehaesang National Park, with an area of . It is located at the western extremity of Jindo Gun (County), South Jeolla Province, in the administrative division of Maenggoldo-ri, Jodo-myeon.

In April 2014, the passenger ferry MV Sewol capsized north of the nearby island Byeongpungdo, and sank off the coast of Donggeochado.

References

External links 
 

Jindo County
Islands of South Jeolla Province
Islands of the Yellow Sea